Rush Rehm is professor of drama and classics at Stanford University in California, in the United States. He also works professionally as an actor and director. He has published many works on classical theatre. Rehm is the artistic director of Stanford Repertory Theater (SRT), a professional theater company that presents a dramatic festival based on a major playwright each summer. SRT's 2016 summer festival, Theater Takes a Stand, celebrates the struggle for workers' rights. A political activist, Rehm has been involved in Central American and Cuban solidarity, supporting East Timorese resistance to the Indonesian invasion and occupation, the ongoing struggle for Palestinian rights, and the fight against US militarism. In 2014, he was awarded Stanford's Lloyd W. Dinkelspiel Award for Outstanding Service to Undergraduate Education.

Life 

Rehm received his BA in creative writing and classics from Princeton University, where he graduated summa cum laude in 1973. In 1975 he received his MA in classical studies from Melbourne University as a Fulbright fellow. He completed his PhD in drama (directing and criticism) and humanities from Stanford University in 1985.

From 1985 to 1990, Rehm was an assistant professor of classics and theater studies at Emory University, where he taught acting and directing in addition to Greek and classical drama. He has taught at Stanford since 1990, where he has held the position of professor of drama and classics since 2003.

He has acted in, directed, and produced dozen of plays, most recently directly SRT's Clytemnestra: Tangled Justice (his adaption of Aeschylus' Oresteia), Words (and Images) to End All Wars (his compilation of artistic responses to World War I), and Orson Welles' The War of the Worlds and Moby Dick - Rehearsed, which received the Theater Bay Area 2014 award for Outstanding Direction, Ensemble, and Production.  In summer 2016, he will play the role of Friar Laurence in We Players production of Shakespeare's Romeo and Juliet at the Rancho Petaluma Adobe State Park and Montalvo Arts Center, Saratoga.

Works

Books
 Radical Theatre: Greek Tragedy and the Modern World, London: Duckworth, 2003, 
 The Play of Space: Spatial Transformation in Greek Tragedy, Princeton University Press, 2002, 
 Marriage to Death: The Conflation of Wedding and Funeral Rituals in Greek Tragedy, Princeton University Press, 1994, 
 Greek Tragic Theatre, Routledge, 1992, 
 A new addition, Understanding Greek Tragic Theatre, will be published in June 2016.
 Aeschylus' Oresteia: A Theatre Version, Melbourne: Hawthorne Press, 1978.

Articles and reviews 
 Rehm, Rush. 1989. "Medea and the Logos of the Heroic." Eranos 87: 97-115.
 ---. 2002. The Play of Space: Spatial Transformation in Greek Tragedy. Princeton: Princeton UP. .
 ---. 2003. Radical Theatre: Greek Tragedy and the Modern World. London: Duckworth. .
 ---. 2004. Introduction. In Oedipus Coloneus by Sophocles. Ed. P E Easterling. Trans. Richard Claverhouse Jebb. London: British Classical Press. .
 ---. 2005. Review in Translation and Literature 14.1: 86. Weblink
 ---. 2005. "Female Solidarity: Timely Resistance in Greek Tragedy," in Rebel Women, ed. S. Wilmer. London: Methuen, 177–92.
 ---. 2006. "Antigone and Family Values," Antigone's Answer: Essays on Death and Burial, Family and State in Classical Athens, ed. C.B. Patterson. Helios Supplement, 187–218.
 ---. 2006. "Sophocles on Fire - To Pyr in Philoctetes," in Sophocles and the Greek Language: Aspects of Diction, Syntax, and the Greek Language, eds. I.J.F. de Jong and A. Rijksbaron. Leiden: Brill, 95-107.
 ---. 2006. "Cassandra - The Prophetess Unveiled," in Agamemnon in Performance, eds. E. Hall and F. McIntosh. Oxford: Oxford University Press, 343–58.
 ---. 2007. "Festivals and Audiences in Athens and Rome," in Cambridge Companion to Greek and Roman Theatre, ed. M. Walton and M. McDonald, 184–218. 
 ---. 2007, paperback 2010. "If you are a woman": Theatrical Womanizing in Sophocles' Antigone and Fugard, Kani, and Ntshona's The Island," in Classics in Post-Colonial Worlds, eds. C. Gillispie and L. Hardwick. Cambridge: Cambridge University Press, 2007/2010, 211-27. 
 ---. 2008. "The Future of Dramatic Literature," in Text and Presentations 28, ed. S. Constantinidis, 216–218. 
 ---. 2009. Review in Classical World 102, 501–2, on How to Stage Greek Tragedy Today by S. Goldhill.
 ---. 2009. Review in Sophocles and the Greek Tragic Tradition, eds. S. Goldhill and E. Hall, in Ancient History Bulletin 23, 108–12.
 ---. 2009. "Tragedy and Privilege," in The Play of Texts and Fragments: Essays in Honour of Martin Cropp, eds. J.R.C. Cousland and J.R. Hume, Mnemosyne, Supplement 314. Leiden and Boston: Brill, 235–53.
 ---. 2009. Review in Sophocles and Alcibiades: Athenian Politics in Ancient Greek Literature by M. Vickers, in Comparative Drama, 402–5.
 ---. 2010. Review in Performance and Culture by K.V. Hartigan, Text & Presentation, 2010. Comparative Drama Conference, 166–8.
 ---. 2012. "Aeschylus" and "Sophocles," in Space in Ancient Greek Literature: Studies in Ancient Greek Narrative, Mnemosyne Supplement, Vol. 339, ed. I.J.F. de Jong. Leiden and Boston: Brill, 307-23 and 325–39.
 ---. 2012. "Ritual in Sophocles," in Brill Companion to Sophocles, ed. A. Markantonatos. Leiden and Boston: Brill, 411–28.
 ---. 2013. Review in Antigone, translated by David Mulroy, Digresses.
 ---. 2015. "Eclectic Encounters: Staging Greek Tragedy in America, 1973-2009," in The Oxford Handbook of Greek Drama in the Americas, eds. K. Bosher, F. Macintosh, J. McConnell, and P. Rankine. Oxford: Oxford University Press, 758–75.
 ---. 2015. Review in Space, Place, and Landscape in Ancient Greek Literature and Culture, eds. K. Gilhuly and N. Worman, in Classical Philology.

See also 
 Theatre of ancient Greece
 Stanford University School of Humanities and Sciences

References

External links
SRT webpage

Stanford University Department of Drama faculty
Living people
1949 births
Stanford University Department of Classics faculty